Leonardo is a masculine given name, the Italian, Spanish, and Portuguese equivalent of the English, German, and Dutch name, Leonard.

People 
Notable people with the name include:
 Leonardo da Vinci (1452–1519), Italian Renaissance scientist, inventor, engineer, sculptor, and painter

Artists 
 Leonardo Schulz Cardoso, Brazilian singer
 Emival Eterno da Costa (born 1963), Brazilian singer known as Leonardo
 Leonardo de Mango (1843–1930), Italian-born Turkish painter
 Leonardo DiCaprio (born 1974), American actor
 Leonardo Pieraccioni (born 1965), Italian actor and director

Athletes 
 Leonardo Araújo (born 1969), usually known as Leonardo, Brazilian World Cup-winning footballer, and former sporting director of Paris Saint Germain
 Leonardo Fioravanti (born 1997), Italian surfer
 Leonardo Lourenço Bastos (born 1975), Brazilian footballer
 Leonardo Bittencourt, German footballer
 Leonardo Bonucci (born 1987), Italian footballer
 Leonardo Candi (born 1997), Italian basketball player
 Leonardo Cardona (born 1971), Colombian road cyclist
 Leonardo Emilio Comici (1901–1940), Italian mountain climber
 Leonardo David (1960–1985), Italian alpine skier
 Leonardo André Pimenta Faria (born 1982), Brazilian footballer
 Leonardo de Jesus Geraldo (born 1985), Brazilian footballer
 Leonardo Renan Simões de Lacerda (born 1988), also known as Léo, Brazilian football defender
 Leonardo Meindl (born 1993), Brazilian basketball forward
 Leonardo José Aparecido Moura (born 1986), Brazilian footballer of Shakhtar Donetsk
 Leonardo Narváez (born 1980), Colombian track cyclist
 Leonardo Rodriguez Pereira (born 1986), Brazilian footballer of Jeonbuk Hyundai Motors
 Leonardo Santiago (born 1983), Brazilian footballer
 Leonardo Ferreira da Silva (born 1980), Brazilian footballer of Chiangrai United
 Leonardo dos Santos Silva (born 1976), Brazilian footballer of FC Dordrecht (also known as Leonardo II)
 José Leonardo Ribeiro da Silva (born 1988), usually known as Leonardo, Brazilian footballer
 Leonardo Sottani, Italian water polo player
 Leonardo Nascimento Lopes de Souza (born 1997), Brazilian footballer
 Leonardo Zappavigna, Australian boxer

Other 
 Leonardo Bruni (c. 1370–1444), humanist, historian and chancellor of Florence
 Leonardo Farkas (born 1967), Chilean businessman
 Leonardo Fibonacci (c. 1170 – c. 1250), Italian mathematician
 Leonardo León (born 1952), Chilean historian
 Leonardo Moze (1892-1955), Italian painter and writer
 Leonardo Zechariah Elizala (born 1999), former Bulawayo junior Councilor

Fictional characters 
 Leonardo, the leader of the four Teenage Mutant Ninja Turtles
 Leonardo Acropolis, painter on the BBC sitcom Blackadder
 Leonardo Leonardo, on the short lived animated series, Clerks: The Animated Series
 Leonardo Vetra, in Dan Brown's novel Angels and Demons
 Leonardo Watch, in the manga series Blood Blockade Battlefront

Entertainment 
 Leonardo, a British television series based on the life of Leonardo da Vinci as a teenager
 Leonardo, an English speaking Italian historical drama series

Business 
 Leonardo S.p.A. an Italian multinational aerospace, defence and security company

Journal 
 Leonardo (journal)

See also 
 Lenny (disambiguation)
 Leonard (disambiguation)
 Leo (disambiguation)
 Leon (disambiguation)

References 

Italian masculine given names
Spanish masculine given names
Portuguese masculine given names